Yeongwon O clan was one of the Korean clans. Their Bon-gwan was in Nyongwon County, South Pyongan Province. According to the research in 2017, the number of Yeongwon O clan was 80.

See also 
 Korean clan names of foreign origin

References

External links 
 

 
Korean clan names of Chinese origin